Walter Lloyd (c. 1678–1747), of Peterwell, Cardiganshire, was a British lawyer and Whig politician who sat in the House of Commons from 1734 to 1742.

Lloyd was the son of David Lloyd of Voelallt, Cardiganshire. He was admitted at Inner Temple in  1695 and matriculated at Brasenose College, Oxford on 6 July 1697, aged 19. He was called to the bar in 1700 and was mayor of Cardigan in 1710 and 1711. He married Elizabeth Evans, daughter of Daniel Evans of Peterwell in about 1713, which established the Lloyds as a political power in Cardiganshire since the Peterwell  estate gave him control of Lampeter,  and an electoral interest in the county. He was Mayor of Cardigan again in 1714. In 1715 he was appointed Attorney-general for South. Wales. He was twice more  mayor of Cardigan in 1718 and 1721. He became a bencher of his Inn in 1725.
 
Lloyd  was returned unopposed as Whig Member of Parliament for Cardiganshire at the 1734 British general election. At 1741 British general election, he was returned in a contest, but was aided by the partisan conduct of a Whig sheriff. He supported Walpole’s Administration until   Walpole’s fall  in 1742, when he was unseated on petition  by the anti-Walpole majority in the House of Commons on  22 March 1742.  He stood unsuccessfully for Cardigan Boroughs  at a by-election in 1746,.

Lloyd died in February 1747 leaving five sons and four daughters. He was succeeded by his eldest son John, who was MP for Cardiganshire. His second son Herbert was the first of the Lloyd baronets.

References

1670s births
1747 deaths
Members of the Parliament of Great Britain for Welsh constituencies
British MPs 1734–1741
British MPs 1741–1747